Hypocrita caeruleomaculata is a moth of the family Erebidae. It was described by Hervé de Toulgoët in 1988. It is found in Bolivia.

References

 

Hypocrita
Moths described in 1988